The number of the beast, 666 in most manuscripts, is associated with the Beast of Revelation in the Book of Revelation in the Bible.

Number of the Beast also may refer to:

 The Number of the Beast (album), 1982, by Iron Maiden
 "The Number of the Beast" (song), from the album 
 The Number of the Beast (play), a 1982 drama by Snoo Wilson about Aleister Crowley
 Number of the Beast (comics), a comic book limited series 
 The Number of the Beast (novel), by Robert Heinlein
 "The Number of the Beast Is 666" (Hannibal), an episode of the TV series
 The Number of the Beast is 666, one of The Great Red Dragon paintings by William Blake

See also
 
 Mark of the Beast (disambiguation)
 616 (number)#Number of the beast, another interpretation of the number of the beast